Word Travels (tagline The Truth Behind the Byline) is an adventure travel television documentary series. An original Canadian production, the show debuted on OLN on January 30, 2008 and aires in Canada on OLN and CityTV, and worldwide on Nat Geo Adventure. The show is co-hosted by Robin Esrock and Julia Dimon, produced by Omni Film Limited, and filmed by Sean Cable.

The first season of Word Travels aired on OLN in Canada and began airing internationally on the National Geographic Adventure worldwide in October 2008. The second season began airing on the OLN on January 18, 2009, and aired on National Geographic Adventure in September, 2009. Season 3 was filmed between April and October 2009, and debuted in Canada on OLN on March 7, 2010.  It airs on Travel Channel (UK) in 21 languages around the world.   Word Travels is often misspelled as World Travels.

Overview
Word Travels follows the lives of two young professional travel writers, South African Robin Esrock and Toronto-based Julia Dimon, as they journey around the world in search of stories to experience, write about, and file for their editors. It is the first TV show to reveal the working reality of modern travel writing.  Robin Esrock was a regular columnist for The Globe and Mail  and freelances for newspapers and magazines worldwide.  Julia Dimon was a weekly columnist for the Metro International's Canadian edition. Esrock focuses on adventurous and physical stories, while Dimon focuses on cultural and people stories. Each episode has the characters investigating a story.

References

2000s Canadian reality television series
2008 Canadian television series debuts
2010s Canadian reality television series